Ha Hyung-joo (born June 3, 1962), also known by Ha Hyoung-zoo, is a retired judoka from South Korea. In 1981, he became the first open division champion to represent South Korea at the Asian Judo Championships in Jakarta. Ha represented his native country at the Judo at the 1984 Summer Olympics, and claimed the gold medal in the men's half heavyweight division (– 95 kg) by defeating Brazil's Douglas Vieira in the final. He also competed at the 1988 Summer Olympics, but did not win a medal.

He retired shortly after the Seoul Olympics and has been working as a physical education professor at Dong-A University.

References

1962 births
Living people
Olympic judoka of South Korea
Judoka at the 1984 Summer Olympics
Judoka at the 1988 Summer Olympics
Olympic gold medalists for South Korea
Olympic medalists in judo
Asian Games medalists in judo
Judoka at the 1986 Asian Games
People from Jinju
South Korean male judoka
Medalists at the 1984 Summer Olympics
Asian Games gold medalists for South Korea
Medalists at the 1986 Asian Games
Universiade medalists in judo
Universiade gold medalists for South Korea
Medalists at the 1985 Summer Universiade
Sportspeople from South Gyeongsang Province
20th-century South Korean people
21st-century South Korean people
Academic staff of Dong-a University